The 2022–23 WSE Champions League is the 56th season of Europe's premier club roller hockey tournament organised by World Skate Europe – Rink Hockey, and the first season under the WSE Champions League branding. This season expanded the maximum number of participating teams from 16 to 32, introducing two preliminary rounds prior to the group stage.

The defending champions are Italian side GSH Trissino, who defeated Portuguese side AD Valongo 3–1 after a penalty shootout in the 2022 final, to win their first title in the competition.

Team allocation

Association ranking

For the 2022–23 WSE Champions League, the associations were allocated places according to their coefficient, which takes into account the performance of each association's representative teams in European competitions between the 2017–18 and the 2021–22 seasons (except for the 2019–20 season, which was discarded due to being interrupted). The coefficient is calculated by dividing the total of points accumulated by the number of participating teams.

The D'Hondt method was applied to the coefficient of each association to determine the number of teams entering in each round:

Schedule
The schedule of the competition is as follows.

First Qualifying Round

Group A

Group B

Group C

Group D

Second Qualifying Round

Group A

Group B

Group C

Group D

Group Stage

Group A

Group B

Group C

Group D

Final Eight

References

External links
 Official website
 Results webpage

Rink Hockey Euroleague
Rink Hockey Euroleague
Rink Hockey Euroleague